Ouled Sidi Brahim district is an Algerian administrative district in the M'Sila province.  Its capital is town of Ouled Sidi Brahim .

Municipalities
The district is further divided into 2 municipalities:
Ouled Sidi Brahim
Benzouh

References 

Districts of Tizi Ouzou Province
Districts of Djelfa Province